Oninia is a genus of frogs belonging to the family Microhylidae.

The species of this genus are found in New Guinea.

Species
Species:
 Oninia senglaubi Günther, Stelbrink & von Rintelen, 2010

References

Microhylidae
Amphibian genera